Willys Desmond Heyliger (born 19 January 1926) was a Curaçaoan footballer. He competed in the men's tournament at the 1952 Summer Olympics.

References

External links
 
 

1926 births
Possibly living people
Curaçao footballers
Netherlands Antilles international footballers
Olympic footballers of the Netherlands Antilles
Footballers at the 1952 Summer Olympics
Place of birth missing
Association football forwards